Reinaldo Gonçalves Félix (born April 13, 1986, in Arapiraca), known as Reinaldo Alagoano, is a Brazilian professional football player who currently plays for ASA.

References

External links
 
 
 

1986 births
Living people
Brazilian footballers
Brazilian expatriate footballers
Brazilian expatriate sportspeople in Spain
Brazilian expatriate sportspeople in Japan
Expatriate footballers in Spain
Expatriate footballers in Japan
Sport Club Corinthians Alagoano players
Clube de Regatas Brasil players
Cruzeiro Esporte Clube players
Esporte Clube Bahia players
Mirassol Futebol Clube players
Boa Esporte Clube players
SD Huesca footballers
J1 League players
Vegalta Sendai players
Agremiação Sportiva Arapiraquense players
Nacional Esporte Clube (MG) players
Associação Atlética Santa Rita players
Centro Sportivo Alagoano players
Central Sport Club players
Clube Atlético Votuporanguense players
Uberlândia Esporte Clube players
Campinense Clube players
Treze Futebol Clube players
Fluminense de Feira Futebol Clube players
Associação Atlética de Altos players
Zumbi Esporte Clube players
Campeonato Brasileiro Série C players
Campeonato Brasileiro Série B players
Campeonato Brasileiro Série D players
Segunda División players
Association football forwards